Petra Nieminen (born 4 May 1999) is a Finnish ice hockey player and alternate captain of the Finnish national team, currently playing in the Swedish Women's Hockey League (SDHL) with Luleå HF/MSSK. She is considered one of the top young talents in Finnish ice hockey.

Playing career 
Nieminen's minor ice hockey career was played with the junior teams of Tappara in her hometown of Tampere. She played on boys' teams during her childhood and into her teen years, playing on the same youth team as future NHLer Patrik Laine. Beginning when she was 13, she intermittently played with the Tappara representative women's team in the Naisten Mestis and Naisten Suomi-sarja, the second-and third-tier women’s senior leagues in Finland.

At age 16, she moved to Kuortane and began attending the Kuortaneen urheilulukio to play with Team Kuortane in the Naisten SM-sarja (renamed Naisten Liiga in 2017). In her first season with Kuortane, Nieminen led the team in scoring, tallying 23 points (15 goals + 8 assists) in 25 games played and was recognized with the Noora Räty Award as best rookie in the Naisten SM-sarja. She was the team’s scoring leader again in the 2016–17 season. In her third season, she was Kuortane’s second-highest scorer, leading the team in points per game, despite missing nine of 30 regular season games because she was representing Finland in the women's ice hockey tournament at the 2018 Winter Olympics, and was named Naisten Liiga Player of the Month for December 2017. Her 15 points (7+8) in eight playoff games helped Team Kuortane claim the Aurora Borealis Cup bronze medal, the first Finnish Championship medal in team history. She was awarded the 2018 Katja Riipi Award for best forward in the Naisten Liiga and was named to the 2018 All-Star First Team.

In 2018, she left Finland to sign with Luleå HF/MSSK in Luleå, Sweden, joining fellow Finnish national team players Jenni Hiirikoski, Michelle Karvinen, Ronja Savolainen, and Noora Tulus on the SDHL team. She scored 24 points (13+11) in 34 games of her rookie SDHL season and contributed 11 points (6+5) in eleven playoff games as Luleå won the SDHL championship.

She more than doubled her point total in the 2019–20 season, scoring 55 points (25+30) in 36 games, leading the team in scoring and finishing third in points among all players in the league. She added another 8 points in 6 playoff games as Luleå returned to the SDHL finals to face HV71 before the season was canceled due to the COVID-19 pandemic in Sweden. She was named the 2020 SDHL MVP and was a Forward of the Year Award finalist.

During the 2020 off-season, she underwent a knee operation that caused her to miss the first few games of the 2020–21 SDHL season.

International career 
Nieminen has represented Finland in international ice hockey competition since 2015, first appearing with the Finnish national under-18 team at the 2015 IIHF World Women's U18 Championship in Buffalo, New York, where she notched five points (2+3) in five games. She scored seven goals and tallied seven assists for the Finland Selects at the 2015 World Selects Invitational in Bolzano.

At the 2016 IIHF World Women's U18 Championship, she was the team leader in points and goals, scoring four goals and two assists in five games, and was selected by the coaches as one of the top-3 players on the team.

She made her debut with the Finnish national team at the 2016 IIHF Women's World Championship, notching three points in six games as Finland finished in fourth. She has played for Finland in every World Championship since, scoring three goals in six games the 2017 IIHF Women's World Championship, as Finland won bronze.

She scored five points in six games for Finland at the 2018 Winter Olympics, the country winning bronze.

However, after a twelve-minute video review, the goal was disallowed in a call that sparked intense controversy. She was one of the five Finnish players to then take a shot in the shootout, which culminated in a victory for the United States.

Career statistics

Regular season and playoffs

International

References

External links
 
 
 

1999 births
Living people
Finnish women's ice hockey forwards
Ice hockey people from Tampere
Luleå HF/MSSK players
Team Kuortane players
Finnish expatriate ice hockey players in Sweden
Ice hockey players at the 2018 Winter Olympics
Ice hockey players at the 2022 Winter Olympics
Olympic bronze medalists for Finland
Olympic ice hockey players of Finland
Olympic medalists in ice hockey
Medalists at the 2018 Winter Olympics
Medalists at the 2022 Winter Olympics